Oberea breviantennalis is a species of longhorn beetle in the tribe Saperdini in the genus Oberea, discovered in 2006.

References

B
Beetles described in 2006